The compositional career of the British composer Michael Tippett extended over eight decades, from juvenilia and unpublished works written in the 1920s to his final works of the 1990s. He composed across many genres, from large-scale orchestral works and full-length operas to solo songs and brass band fanfares. From the mid-1930s his music began to be published and performed publicly. The main list is restricted to published and publicly performed works; a subsidiary list gives details of unpublished pieces, some of which may have been privately performed.

Published works

Juvenilia and unpublished works
The following works are listed by Kemp as (a) works or fragments whose manuscripts have survived and (b) works whose manuscripts are lost but of which there is a record of public performance.

References
Citations

Sources

Tippett
Compositions by Michael Tippett